Tony Giglio is an American film director (born June 3, 1971) from Medford, Massachusetts. He graduated from Seton Hall University in 1993 with a Bachelor of Arts degree.

Filmography

Director

Writer

Set production assistant

Actor

References

External links

American people of Italian descent
1971 births
Living people
People from Medford, Massachusetts
Seton Hall University alumni
Film directors from Massachusetts